Patriot is a town in Posey Township, Switzerland County, in the U.S. state of Indiana, along the Ohio River. The population was 209 at the 2010 census.

Geography
Patriot is located at  (38.838215, −84.827764). It is the easternmost settlement in Indiana.

History
Patriot was originally called Troy, and under the latter name was platted in 1812. The Patriot post office has been in operation since 1827.

Patriot has suffered several calamities in its history. A 1924 fire destroyed a large portion of its downtown. The town was again devastated in the Ohio River flood of 1937.

Demographics

2010 census
As of the census of 2010, there were 209 people, 76 households, and 59 families residing in the town. The racial makeup of the town was 98.1% White, 0.5% Native American, 0.5% Asian, 0.5% from other races, and 0.5% from two or more races. Hispanic or Latino of any race were 1.4% of the population.

There were 76 households, of which 27.6% had children under the age of 18 living with them, 57.9% were married couples living together, 11.8% had a female householder with no husband present, 7.9% had a male householder with no wife present, and 22.4% were non-families. 17.1% of all households were made up of individuals, and 2.6% had someone living alone who was 65 years of age or older. The average household size was 2.75 and the average family size was 2.97.

The median age in the town was 42.1 years. 23% of residents were under the age of 18; 5.1% were between the ages of 18 and 24; 26.3% were from 25 to 44; 34% were from 45 to 64; and 11.5% were 65 years of age or older. The gender makeup of the town was 54.1% male and 45.9% female.

2000 census
As of the census of 2000, there were 202 people, 73 households, and 60 families residing in the town. The racial makeup of the town was 98.02% White, 0.50% African American, 0.50% Native American, and 0.99% from two or more races. Hispanic of any race were 0.99% of the population.

There were 73 households, out of which 38.4% had children under the age of 18 living with them, 63.0% were married couples living together, 13.7% had a female householder with no husband present, and 17.8% were non-families. 13.7% of all households were made up of individuals, and 2.7% had someone living alone who was 65 years of age or older. The average household size was 2.77 and the average family size was 3.00.

In the town, the population was spread out, with 27.2% under the age of 18, 8.9% from 18 to 24, 29.7% from 25 to 44, 26.2% from 45 to 64, and 7.9% who were 65 years of age or older. The median age was 36 years. For every 100 females, there were 114.9 males. For every 100 females age 18 and over, there were 113.0 males.

The median income for a household in the town was $37,500, and the median income for a family was $38,438. Males had a median income of $29,135 versus $26,071 for females. The per capita income for the town was $16,866. About 6.0% of families and 10.4% of the population were below the poverty line, including 17.6% of those under the age of eighteen and none of those 65 or over.

Notable people 
 M. Catherine Allen – Shaker; member of the Central Shaker Ministry and historian
 Elwood Mead – head of the United States Bureau of Reclamation from 1924 to 1936; oversaw construction of Hoover Dam
 Lydia Moss Bradley – Philanthropist and founder of Bradley University

See also
 List of cities and towns along the Ohio River

References

Towns in Switzerland County, Indiana
Indiana populated places on the Ohio River
Populated places established in 1812
1812 establishments in Indiana Territory